Montdois is a mountain of the Guilleries Massif, Catalonia, Spain. It has an elevation of 928.1 metres above sea level.

References

Mountains of Catalonia